The Never Ending Tour is the popular name for Bob Dylan's endless touring schedule since June 7, 1988.

Information
The tour began with three shows at the House of Blues in Dallas before performing in Latin America and South America. Dylan performed three shows in Brazil, including one at the HSBC Arena and two shows at Via Funchal in São Paulo.

After completing the South of the South Tour Dylan went on a brief tour to the United States and Canada. After touring North America Dylan and the band travelled to Europe to perform 30 shows including an appearance at Rock In Rio Lisbon and Optimus Alive!.

Dylan then returned to the United States to start a summer tour starting in Philadelphia on August 8 and coming to an end on September in Santa Barbara. Dylan and the band continued to tour North America throughout the fall of 2008 where the tour finally came to a close on November 21, 2008 at the United Palace Theater in New York City after 98 concerts.

Tour dates

Notes

References

External links

BobLinks – Comprehensive log of concerts and set lists
Bjorner's Still on the Road – Information on recording sessions and performances

Bob Dylan concert tours
2008 concert tours